The term invasion of privacy may refer to:

Law 
 Privacy laws of the United States, which define several "invasion of privacy" torts
 Intrusion on Seclusion, a tort of intentionally and offensively intruding on someone's private affairs
 Expectation of privacy, one element of an intrusion claim
 False light, publicity about someone that creates a misleading and offensive impression
 Personality rights, rights to control the use of one's name and likeness
 The Right to Privacy (article), an essay by Louis Brandeis and Samuel Warren

Music 
 Invasion of Privacy (album), a 2018 album by Cardi B
 Invasion of Your Privacy, a 1985 album by Ratt
 "Invasion of Privacy", a 1980 single by Gary Wilson

Film 
 Invasion of Privacy (film), a 1996 film directed by Anthony Hickox

Technology 
 Privacy-invasive software, computer software that invades privacy

See also 
 Internet privacy
 Privacy concerns with social networking services